is a football stadium in Nikaho, Akita Prefecture, Japan. The stadium has a capacity of 4,430 and was the home ground of J3 League club Blaublitz Akita.

References

External links

Football venues in Japan
Rugby union stadiums in Japan
Blaublitz Akita
Sports venues in Akita Prefecture